Robin Stevens may refer to:
 Robin Stevens (puppeteer)
 Robin Stevens (author)
 Robin Stevens (rugby union)